Inter-city rail services are express passenger train services that run services that connect cities over longer distances than commuter or regional trains. They include rail services that are neither short-distance commuter rail trains within one city area, nor slow regional rail trains stopping at all stations and covering local journeys only. An inter-city train is typically an express train with limited stops and comfortable carriages to serve long-distance travel.

Inter-city rail sometimes provides international services. This is most prevalent in Europe, due to the close proximity of its 50 countries in a 10,180,000 square kilometre (3,930,000 sq mi) area.   Eurostar and EuroCity are examples of this. In many European countries, the word InterCity or Inter-City is an official brand name for a network of regular-interval, relatively long-distance train services that meet certain criteria of speed and comfort. This use of the term appeared in the United Kingdom in the 1960s and has been widely imitated.

Speed 

As a result, Inter-city rail may or may not fall into the category of higher-speed rail or high-speed rail.

Distance of inter-city rail 

 50–100 km

The distance of an inter-city rail journey is usually at least , although in many large metropolitan areas commuter and regional services cover equal or longer distances. Examples of countries with relatively short intercity rail distances with service patterns comparable to commuter rail include Belgium, Israel, The Netherlands, and Switzerland.

 100–500 km

In many cases, railway travel is most competitive at about two to three hours journey time. Inter-city rail can often compete with highways and short-haul air travel for journeys of this distance. Most major intercity railway routes in Europe, such as London to Birmingham, Paris to Lyon, and Lisbon to Porto cover this range of distances.

 500–1,000 km

Development of high-speed rail in some countries increases the share of railway for such longer-distance journeys. The Paris-Marseille TGV (or 3 hours) and Tokyo-Aomori Shinkansen (or 2 hours 59 minutes) are examples of this type of journey. In conventional non high-speed rail, overnight trains are common for this distance.

 1,000 km or more

In some countries with a dense rail network, large territory, or less air and car transport, such as China, India, and Russia, overnight long-distance train services are provided and used practically.

In many other countries, such long-distance rail journey has been replaced by air travel except for tourism or hobbyist purposes, luxury train journeys, or significant cost benefit. Amtrak long-distance services in the United States, Via Rail's Canadian service in Canada, and the Indian Pacific in Australia are examples.

Inter-city rail by country

Africa

Railways in Africa are still developing or not practically used for passenger purposes in many countries, but the following countries have inter-city services between major cities:

Algeria: SNTF
Egypt: Egyptian National Railways
Morocco: ONCF (in French - Office National des Chemins de Fer du Maroc, National Office for Railways of Morocco)
South Africa: Shosholoza Meyl
Tunisia: Tunisian Railways (SNCFT)

Asia

East Asia

China

Trains run by China Railway link almost every town and city in the People's Republic of China, including Beijing, Guangzhou, Shanghai, Shenzhen, and Xi'an, and onwards from Shenzhen across the border to Kowloon, in Hong Kong. New high-speed lines from  operation are constructed, and many conventional lines are also upgraded to  operation. Currently there are seven High-Speed Inter-City lines in China, with up to 21 planned. They are operated independently from the often parallel High-Speed-Rail-Lines.

Japan

Japan has six main regional passenger railway companies, known collectively as Japan Railways Group or simply as JR. Five JR companies operate the "bullet trains" on very fast and frequent Shinkansen lines that link all the larger cities, including Tokyo, Yokohama, Nagoya, Kyoto, Osaka, Hiroshima, Fukuoka and many more.

Major cities are covered by convenient train services of every one hour or more frequent. In addition to the JR Group, Japan has major private rail operators such as the Kintetsu, Meitetsu, Tobu Railway and Odakyu Electric Railway that operate "limited express" inter-city services.

Hong Kong

Inter-city railway services crossing the Hong Kong-China border (often known as through trains) are jointly operated by Hong Kong's MTR Corporation Limited and the Ministry of Railways of the People's Republic of China. Currently, Hung Hom station is the only station in the territory where passengers can catch these cross-border trains. Passengers are required to go through immigration and customs inspections of Hong Kong before boarding a cross-border train or alighting from such a train. There are currently three cross-border train services on the conventional line:
 Between Hong Kong and Beijing (Beijing–Kowloon through train)
 Between Hong Kong and Shanghai (Shanghai–Kowloon through train)
 Between Hong Kong and Guangzhou (Guangzhou–Kowloon through train)

A new border-crossing service, the Guangzhou–Shenzhen–Hong Kong Express Rail Link, has been approved and has been granted HKD 6.6 billion in funding by the Legislative Council's Finance Committee. The line has been opened in 2018 with a new station West Kowloon Terminus in the city centre.

Taiwan

Taiwan's coastline is connected by frequent inter-city train services by Taiwan Railway Administration. Taiwan High Speed Rail, opened in 2007, covers the most populated west-coast corridor. Chinese：對號列車

There are Chu-kuang express (莒光號) and Tze-chiang limited express (自強號).

South Korea

Almost every major town and city in South Korea is linked by railway, run by Korail. ITX-Saemaeul is operated in most Main railway lines like Japanese limited express or German Intercity. Also, Mugunghwa-ho is the most common and most popular type of intercity rail travel like German Regional-Express. In addition, Seoul and Busan are linked by a high-speed train line known as KTX, which was built using French TGV technology.

South Asia

Bangladesh

India

India's inter-city trains are run by Indian Railways. With  of rail routes and 6,800 stations, the railway network in India is the third-largest in the world (after Russia and China) and the largest in the world in terms of passenger kilometres. The Vande Bharat Express, Gatimaan Express Tejas Express, Tejas-Rajdhani Express, Rajdhani Express, Shatabdi Express, Jan Shatabdi Express and Duronto Express are the fastest Inter-city services in India of which the Vande Bharat Express is the fastest train of India.  All long-distance journeys generally require a reservation and unreserved travel is allowed in some trains.

Pakistan

Sri Lanka

Southeast Asia

Burma

Cambodia
There is only one train service in Cambodia, from Phnom Penh to Sihanoukville, stopping at Doun Kaev (Takeo) and Kampot.

Indonesia

In Indonesia, PT Kereta Api operates inter-city services in many cities, especially in Java. Inter-city serves some of Indonesia's major cities like Jakarta, Bandung, Semarang, Yogyakarta, Surakarta, Surabaya, Medan, Padang, and Palembang. In Jakarta metropolitan area (or Jabodetabek), KRL Jabotabek operates the inter-city and commuter. Currently under construction is an elevated high-speed rail line between the Western Javanese cities of Jakarta and Bandung which aims to reduce travel times and alleviate congestion.

Laos 
In recent years construction has started on a China-funded higher-speed railway link, the Boten–Vientiane railway, commonly referred to as the China-Laos Railway. A fully electrified higher-speed railway line, it is part of a long-term goal of connecting China with the rest of Southeast Asia. The line runs from Boten near the China-Laos border to Vientiane, the capital of Laos, using CRRC high/higher-speed EMU trains.

Malaysia

Keretapi Tanah Melayu (Malayan Railways) operates loco-hauled express trains called KTM Intercity along Peninsular Malaysia and into Singapore. At the Malaysia–Thailand border, connections to State Railway of Thailand trains are available. KTM Intercity trains are diesel-powered and run on a single-track  system. The rail track is gradually being duplicated and electrified. On the completed Central to Northern section (border), KTM runs the higher-speed Electric Train Service (ETS).

Philippines

As of February 2020, the Philippine National Railways does not have a regular inter-city rail service although the agency is planning on rebuilding new railway lines. Prior to the 1970s, the main island of Luzon had a relatively expansive narrow-gauge railway network, but government prioritization towards highway construction and the effects of multiple natural disasters gradually led to the decline and abandonment of most intercity rail services. Until the 2000s, PNR had two inter-city rail services: the Bicol Express and the Mayon Limited. The Bicol Express leaves Manila and passes through Manila, Pasay, and Muntinlupa and the provinces of Laguna, Quezon, and Camarines Sur before arriving at Naga. The trip takes 10 hours, or 600 minutes. The Mayon Limited connects Minola and Ligao in  hours. However, the now 2022, successful North-South Commuter Railway is under construction until 2023. A new railway in the Philippines is planned in the future.

Thailand

Thailand has a sizable meter-gauge intercity rail network radiating outwards from Bangkok, transporting around 60 million passengers every year. Construction is underway to connect Bangkok with Nakhon Ratchasima using a dedicated high speed rail line.

Vietnam
Trains in Vietnam, run by Vietnam Railways, link Hanoi, Hué, Da Nang, Nha Trang, and Ho Chi Minh City.

Southwest Asia

Iran

Israel
Israel Railways operates inter-city services between all the four major metropolitan areas of Israel: Tel Aviv, Jerusalem, Be'er Sheva, and Haifa. However, due to the small geography of Israel, most of the railway services have a more suburban service pattern, with many short stops at stations between the major city centres.

Europe

Western and Central Europe

In Europe, many long-distance inter-city trains are operated under the InterCity (often simply IC) brand. InterCity (or, initially, "Inter-City" with a hyphen) was first conceived as a brand name by British Rail for the launch of its electrification of the major part of the West Coast Main Line in 1966, which brought new express services between London and the major cities of Manchester, Birmingham and Liverpool. It later became the name of one of British Rail's new business sectors in the 1980s and was used to describe the whole network of main-line passenger routes in Great Britain, but it went out of official use following privatisation. The introduction of the British Rail Class 43 (HST) helped InterCity become an iconic brand in the 1970s.

The principal network of international express trains in continental Europe is called EuroCity, even though some InterCity trains also cross borders.

High-speed railways have relatively few stops. The German high-speed train service was named InterCityExpress, indicating its evolution from older InterCity trains. Other high-speed lines include the TGV (France), AVE (Spain), Treno Alta Velocità (Italy), Eurostar (United Kingdom–France and Belgium), Thalys (Netherlands–Belgium–Germany and France) and Railjet (Germany-Austria–Czechia/Hungary).

In Great Britain, the inter-city rail links are now operated by a number of private companies as well as Continental State owned railways such as Avanti West Coast, LNER, EMR, CrossCountry, TransPennine Express, Greater Anglia, and GWR. Ireland's inter-city rail network is maintained by Iarnród Éireann and Northern Ireland's is run by Northern Ireland Railways.

Central and Eastern Europe

Poland

The Polish State Railways (PKP), a state-owned corporate group, is the main provider of railway services. The PKP group holds an almost unrivaled monopoly over rail services in Poland since it is both supported and partly funded by the national government.

As of 2018, foreign services operate on the Polish Railways network. These include EuroCity and EuroNight trains operating between Western and Eastern European destinations, including by the EN 440/441 from Berlin via Warsaw to Moscow operated by Talgo train of Russian Railways company.

In 2019, new nightjet train from Wien to Berlin via Ostrava (CZ) and Wroclaw (PL) starts the service. .

Russia
Russia has a dense network of long-distance railways all over its vast territory, the longest and most famous being the Trans-Siberian Railway from Moscow to Vladivostok. Speed is relatively low: trains average .

North America

Canada

Canada's inter-city trains are mostly run by Via Rail, a Canadian crown corporation mandated to operate inter-city passenger rail service in Canada. The majority of its services connect major cities in the most populous part of the country known as the Quebec City - Windsor Corridor, straddling the provinces of Ontario and Quebec. It also operates long-distance trains to western Canada and the Maritimes on the Canadian and Ocean lines and by smaller trains to more remote areas of Canada. Much like the United States, Canada previously had a larger intercity rail network prior to the 1970s; certain major cities such as Calgary and Regina lack connections to the extant Via Rail network, and passenger rail usage outside of the Quebec City - Windsor Corridor is infrequent and geared towards the tourism market.

International trains, run jointly by Amtrak and Via Rail, connect New York City with Toronto. Amtrak also operates the Adirondack between New York City and Montreal, and the Amtrak Cascades service linking Vancouver and Seattle. In addition, the White Pass and Yukon Route links Skagway and Whitehorse on an isolated northern route.

Other inter-city passenger rail operators include the Ontario Northland Railway, which operates passenger services between Cochrane and Moosonee in rural northern Ontario and luxury train operators such as the Royal Canadian Pacific and Rocky Mountaineer, which operate rail tours in Western Canada.

Mexico

In Mexico, the federal government discontinued almost all scheduled inter-city passenger trains in June 2001. Ferromex operates trains on three routes: Chihuahua City to Los Mochis, Torreón to Felipe Pescador, and Guadalajara to Amatitán. Mexican President Enrique Peña Nieto has proposed intercity trains, including from Mexico City to Toluca (construction began July 7, 2014), the Peninsular train from Yucatán to Riviera Maya, and the Mexico-Querétaro high-speed train from Puebla to Tlaxcala and Mexico City with future expansion to Guadalajara.

United States

There was a dense system of inter-city railways in the United States in the late 19th and early 20th centuries. After the decline of passenger railroads in North America in the 1960s, the inter-city lines decreased greatly and today the national system is far less dense. The most heavily used routes with the greatest ridership and schedule frequencies are in the Northeastern United States on Amtrak's Northeast Corridor. About one in every three users of mass transit in the United States and two-thirds of the nation's rail riders live in New York City. The two busiest passenger rail stations in the United States are Penn Station and Grand Central Terminal, both in Manhattan, New York City. Passenger rail outside the Northeast, Northwest, California, and the Chicago metropolitan area is infrequent and rarely used relative to networks in Europe and Japan.

Passenger lines in most of the United States are operated by the quasi-public corporation Amtrak. The separate Alaska Railroad, which is also government-owned, runs passenger trains in Alaska, and the privately owned Brightline rail service operates in Florida. The California High-Speed Rail system began construction in 2015 and aims to connect major job centers in California.

Multiple new rail corridors have been identified for private development throughout the country. These include the Brightline West corridor from Las Vegas to Victor Valley, California, the Texas Central Railway between Dallas and Houston in Texas, and others.

Oceania

Australia

In Australia, the national interstate network operated by Journey Beyond connects all mainland Australian capital cities except Canberra. However, it is catered towards the luxury tourism market. NSW TrainLink operates interstate services from Sydney to Canberra, Melbourne and Brisbane. Intrastate inter-city trains that traverse shorter distances are operated by V/Line, NSW TrainLink, Queensland Rail and Transwa. Many of Australia's inter-city trains are not true inter-city services, given their leisurely average speed and primary role to transport people between regional areas and the nearest capital city or for the tourist market. As a result, Australian networks refer to these services as country or regional trains. The fastest intercity trains in regular service are the Queensland Rail Tilt Train, NSW TrainLink XPT, V/Line VLocity and Transwa WDA/WDB/WDC class, all of which have a top service speed of 160 km/h.

In Australia, electrified interurban commuter railway systems are used to connect urban areas separated by long distances and use heavy-rail equipment:

In New South Wales, NSW TrainLink operates an extensive interurban network of four main routes from Sydney. These run to Newcastle and the Central Coast, the Blue Mountains, the Southern Highlands and the South Coast. NSW TrainLink brand its interurban commuter services as "Intercity".
In Brisbane, QR's City network operates a smaller interurban commuter network of three lines which connect Brisbane to the Gold Coast in the south, Caboolture and the Sunshine Coast in the north and Rosewood in the west.
In Perth, an electric interurban rail line running down the middle of the Kwinana Freeway to serve Mandurah opened on December 23, 2007.

On these systems, services either run as limited-stop expresses in the suburban area or as shuttles terminating where the suburban lines end.

A large-scale non-electric project of four regional lines known as the Regional Fast Rail is operational in Victoria. Current interurban and intercity journeys outside the suburban area are often locomotive-hauled, particularly for longer distance services, due to Victoria's lack of electrification outside of Melbourne.

New Zealand 
In New Zealand, there are currently three long-distance passenger services classed as inter-city: the Coastal Pacific, the Northern Explorer, and the TranzAlpine. Their slow average speed is limited by the rugged country traversed, particularly in the middle of the North Island, where the North Island Main Trunk has many sharp curves and steep gradients. Given these speeds, as well as the prioritization of the rail transport in New Zealand towards freight, these passenger services primarily cater the tourist market, similar to long-distance routes in Australia.

Other current commuter passenger services include the Capital Connection, Te Huia and the Wairarapa Connection. A network of regional and long-distance rail passenger services until the mid-twentieth century has largely been replaced by air or bus services.

South America
A few countries of South America were once interconnected by international train services, but today they are almost non-existent, with the noticeable exceptions of Argentina and Chile. Most governments in the continent have favored roads and automobile transportation since the mid-20th century.

Argentina
Argentina has inter-city services on a number of routes, run by Operadora Ferroviaria Sociedad del Estado. Trains in Argentina are experiencing a revival, since the government intends to re-establish long-distance passenger trains between major cities.

Bolivia
Inter-city train services in Bolivia are operated by two train companies: Eastern and Western.  The western network runs daily trains from Oruro to Tupiza, with both espresso (fast) and WaraWara (slow) trains. The eastern rail hub is Santa Cruz de la Sierra, with connections to Puerto Suárez and Villamontes, and international lines to Brazil and Argentina.

Brazil
Brazil's inter-city services operate on two routes, one from Vitória to Belo Horizonte (Vitória-Minas Railway) and another from Parauapebas to São Luís. A third service was proposed by São Paulo state government to operate from São Paulo to Americana.

Chile

Chile has inter-city services connecting Santiago to Chillán and occasionally to Temuco, run by Empresa de los Ferrocarriles del Estado.

See also
Express train
Limited-stop
Lists of named passenger trains
Longest train journeys
PKP Intercity
Railway electrification systems
Railway stations in the Netherlands#Categories (spelling: "intercity")
Terminal station

References 

Overseas Timetable: Independent Traveller's Edition, Winter 2008/9; Thomas Cook Publishing
European Rail Timetable: Independent Traveller's Edition, Winter 2008/9; Thomas Cook Publishing

External links
The Man in Seat 61 Information on train travel worldwide
 

Passenger rail transport